Nadine Roberts (born August 20, 1994) is a controversial Australian beauty pageant titleholder who despite placing third runner up was crowned as Miss Earth Australia 2014 after the initial winner was dethroned, amidst a corruption scandal.

Nadine Roberts initially placed fourth and received the title of Miss Earth Australia – Fire, at the Miss Earth Australia 2014 pageant. Two weeks later, the original winner Dayana was dethroned by then director Roselyn Singh. Roselyn then gave the title of Miss Earth Australia 2014 to Nadine who was placed third runner up, this created a media furore amidst a major corruption scandal as to why the first and second runner up contestants had not been considered to be crowned as Dayana's replacement.

Pageantry

Miss Earth 2014 
Nadine competed against 84 other candidates in the Miss Earth 2014 pageant held on 29 November 2014 at the UP Theatre in Diliman, Quezon City, Philippines. Nadine was unplaced.

Miss Earth Australia 2014
Miss Earth Australia 2014 edition was held at Sydney Town hall  on September 14. Nadine once again joined the Miss Earth pageant for Australia for the second time, this time Nadine placed fourth (third runner up) and received the title Miss Earth Australia - Fire 2014, the pageant was won by Dayana who held the title of Miss Earth Australia 2014. 

Two weeks after the national finals, the then director of Miss Earth Australia Roselyn Singh dethroned Dayana. The national 2014 Miss Earth Australia organisation became embroiled in controversy and corruption rumours as Dayana's dethronement was surrounded by unfairness & ambiguity, along with the fact Nadine who initially placed third runner up, was replaced as the new Miss Earth Australia 2014 with disregard to using the first and second runner up title holders as replacement.

Miss Earth Australia 2013 
Nadine joined the 2013 edition of Miss Earth Australia. She placed as the third runner up and won the title of Miss Earth Australia - Air or the equivalent of third runner up. The edition won by Renera Thompson. Renera competed in Miss Earth 2013 but went unplaced.

References

Miss Earth 2014 contestants
Models from Sydney
Australian beauty pageant winners
Living people
1994 births